

This page lists board and card games, wargames, miniatures games, and tabletop role-playing games published in 1986.  For video games, see 1986 in video gaming.

Games released or invented in 1986

Game awards given in 1986
 Spiel des Jahres: Top Secret Spies (German title is Heimlich and Co.)

Significant games-related events in 1986
Coleco purchases Selchow and Righter for US$75 million.

See also
 1986 in video gaming

Games
Games by year